The Faroese Teachers' Association is a trade union for educators in the Faroe Islands. The association was established in 1898, and its press, Bókadeild Føroya Lærarafelags (Faroese Teachers' Association Publishing Company), was established in 1956.

Chairpersons

Jacob Eli S. Olsen 2019–
Herálvur Jacobsen 2010–2019
Páll Poulsen 2010 (acting)
Magnus Tausen 2003–2010
Elsa Birgitta Petersen 1999–2003
Andras L. Samuelsen 1997–1999
Jenny Lydersen 1997
Esmar Berg 1992–1997
Inga Høgenni 1988–1992
Trygvi Teirin 1984–1988
Marita Petersen 1980–1984
Eilif Samuelsen 1969–1980
Hans Kristiansen 1968–1969

Johannes A. Næs 1964–1968
Ludvig Petersen 1963–1964
Johannes A. Næs 1960–1963
Poul E. Petersen 1954–1960
Marius Johannesen 1942–1954
Rikard Long 1934–1942
Mikkjal á Ryggi 1930–1934
Peter Mohr Dam 1927–1930
Símun Pauli úr Konoy 1915–1927
Poul Jensen 1902–1915
Louis Bergh 1898–1902

References

External links 
Faroese Teachers' Association website
Faroese Teachers' Association Publishing Company website

Education in the Faroe Islands
Educational organizations based in the Faroe Islands
Trade unions established in 1898